Burrata is an Italian cow milk (occasionally buffalo milk) cheese made from mozzarella and cream. The outer casing is solid cheese, while the inside contains stracciatella and cream, giving it an unusual, soft texture. It is typical of Puglia.

History
Burrata is a typical product of Murgia, in Puglia in the southern Italy. It is produced from cow's milk, rennet, and cream, and may have origins dating back to about 1900, produced at the Bianchino brothers (Lorenzo and Vincenzo) farm in the town of Andria. More recent records have shown that Lorenzo Bianchino of the Piana Padura farm first developed the product in 1956.

In the 1950s, it became more widely available after some local cheese factories began producing it and it can be a useful way of using up the ritagli ("scraps" or "rags") of mozzarella.

In November 2016 "Burrata di Andria" became a protected geographical indication (PGI) product.

Established as an artisanal cheese, burrata maintained its premium-product status even after it began to be made commercially in factories throughout Puglia.

Burrata is also produced in the United States, particularly in artisanal cheese shops in cities on the East Coast with historically large populations of Italian Americans. Nevertheless, the original "Burrata di Andria" is registered as a Protected Geographical Indication in the EU and UK and all operations from the processing of the raw materials up to the production of the finished product must take place in the defined geographical area of the Region of Apulia.

Production

Burrata starts out much like mozzarella and many other cheeses, with rennet used to curdle the warm milk. Unlike other cheeses, however, the fresh mozzarella curds are plunged into hot whey or lightly salted water, kneaded, and pulled to develop the familiar stretchy strings (pasta filata), then shaped.

When making burrata, the still-hot cheese is formed into a pouch, which is then filled with the scraps of leftover mozzarella and topped off with fresh cream before closing. The finished burrata is traditionally wrapped in the leaves of asphodel, tied to form a little brioche-like topknot, and moistened with a little whey. The asphodel leaves should still be green when the cheese is served to indicate the cheese's freshness. More recently, the cheese is often sold in a plastic bag or container, sometimes stored in liquid.

Serving suggestions
When the burrata is sliced open, the thickened stracciatella flows out. The cheese has a rich, buttery flavor and retains its fresh milkiness. It is best when eaten within 24 hours and is considered past its prime after 48 hours.  Thanks to its flavor and differing textures inside and outside, it goes well with salad, prosciutto crudo, crusty bread, fresh tomatoes with olive oil, cracked black pepper, or pizza, pasta, and chili.

See also
 List of Italian cheeses
 List of cheeses
 List of water buffalo cheeses

References

Cow's-milk cheeses
Cream cheeses
Cuisine of Apulia
Italian cheeses
Water buffalo's-milk cheeses